Raymore Township is a township in Cass County, in the U.S. state of Missouri.  The township had 28,306 residents as of a 2015 estimate.  The township borders Jackson County and includes the city of Raymore

Raymore Township was established in 1873.

References

Townships in Missouri
Townships in Cass County, Missouri